Simone Kirby (born 28 October 1976) is an Irish actress. She is probably best known for playing Oonagh in the Ken Loach film Jimmy's Hall. Other credits include Irene O'Donnell in Peaky Blinders (2014), Marilyn Hull in Notes on Blindness (2016), Tyva Hightopp in Alice Through The Looking Glass (2016), Sr. Grace in Houdini and Doyle (2016), Maria Roche in The Truth Commissioner (2016), Annette Rane in Clean Break (2015), Tracey Moynihan in Love/Hate (2014) and Geraldine Grehan in the RTÉ series Pure Mule. She co-wrote and performed in the RTÉ comedy sketch show Meet Your Neighbours in 2011 with P.J. Gallagher. She also appeared in Season of the Witch in 2011. On stage she appeared in Dancing at Lughnasa at The Old Vic, Macbeth at Shakespeare's Globe, Molly Sweeney at the Irish Rep in New York and Curve in Leicester, Festen at the Gate Theatre, Mud and Cat on a Hot Tin Roof with the Corn Exchange, Dublin, Don Carlos and The Taming of the Shrew with Rough Magic and The Tinker's Wedding under Garry Hynes for the Druid Theatre Company's DruidSynge. She also portrayed Nuala in The Cavalcaders under Robin Lefevre and Lady Teasle in The School For Scandal under Jimmy Fay at Dublin's Abbey Theatre.

Filmography

References

External links
 

Irish stage actresses
Irish television actresses
Living people
People from Ennis
1976 births